Vehari Wildlife Park is a public wildlife park located in Vehari, Punjab, Pakistan.

History

Species and animals
The park housed a total of 73 mammals of 7 species and 139 birds of 14 species back in 2004. These may have included captive lions, blue bull, hog deer, common peafowl, species of monkeys, rabbits, pheasants, waterfowls and parrots.

References

External links
 Main entrance view of Vehari Wildlife Park
 Deer at Vehari Wildlife Park

Zoos in Pakistan
Vehari District
Parks in Pakistan
Tourist attractions in Vehari